With Broken Wings is a 1938  Argentine drama film directed by Orestes Caviglia. The film premiered in Buenos Aires.

External links

1938 films
1930s Spanish-language films
Argentine black-and-white films
Films directed by Orestes Caviglia
Argentine drama films
1938 drama films
1930s Argentine films